The Theatre Royal in Manchester, England, opened in 1845. Situated next to the Free Trade Hall, it is the oldest surviving theatre in Manchester. It was commissioned by Mancunian businessman John Knowles who wanted a theatre venue in the city.

The Theatre Royal operated as a theatre from 1845 until 1921, when it closed in the face of growing competition from the Palace Theatre and Opera House. The building has since been converted numerous times for use as a cinema, bingo hall and nightclub. It has been unoccupied since 2009.

Architecture
The theatre, which stands on an island site on the south side of Peter Street, is constructed in sandstone ashlar.  It is in two storeys, with an attic, and is in neoclassical style.  Around the building, between the upper storey and the attic, is a modillioned cornice. Its entrance front facing Peter Street is symmetrical with three bays, the central bay being wider than the lateral bays.  The central bay is in the form of a portico, with Corinthian columns and pilasters.  Its entablature contains a central semicircular arch breaking through to the gable.  Steps lead up to entrances in each bay.  Above the central entrance is a pedimented niche containing a statue of William Shakespeare, which is based on the statue by Peter Scheemakers in Westminster Abbey.  The lateral bays contain windows with balconies in the upper storey.  Along the sides of the theatre are alternating rectangular windows and panels, with a blank semicircular arch above each window.  The interior of the theatre has been altered, but retains its 1875 gallery.  The theatre was designated as a Grade II listed building on 3 October 1974.  The authors of the Buildings of England series describe it as a "splendid classical composition in stone, one of the best examples of theatre architecture surviving anywhere in England from the first half of the 19th century". The Theatres Trust described it as "unique and architecturally significant", with the façade being "one of the finest examples of theatre architecture to have survived in Britain from the first half of the nineteenth century", stating that it influenced the design of the Royal Opera House, London.

Use as a theatre
Manchester appears to have two previous Theatre Royals before the current building was constructed in 1845. The first opened in Spring Gardens on 5 June 1775 and operated on that site until the expiration of the proprietors' lease in 1807.

The second Theatre Royal opened in Fountain Street on 12 July 1807 and was destroyed by fire on 7 March 1844. John Knowles took over the management of this second Theatre Royal some time before the fire, at a time when the theatre in Manchester was at its lowest ebb. Knowles set up a strong stock company and proved himself a very capable, though somewhat authoritarian, theatre manager. However, following the 1844 fire the proprietors of the theatre in Fountain Street refused to rebuild it.

At a public dinner in his honour in July 1844, Knowles was presented a plate "in acknowledgement of his energetic and successful efforts to revive national drama in Manchester". Knowles told the gathering that if they could get no one else to build a theatre then he would do it himself. As a result, Knowles bought the patent rights and set about finding a site for the new theatre. Knowles had always been an admirer of theatrical performances and he was anxious to see their renovation in this, his native town. He desired to see the revival of the legitimate drama, and the plays represented in a manner duly worthy of them.

Knowles found a new site for his theatre on Peter Street. He demolished the Wellington Inn and Brogden's Horse Bazaar.  Knowles employed Francis Chester and John Gould Irwin as the architects for his new theatre.  In preparation for the building of the new Theatre Royal, Knowles and Chester went to London and visited most of the metropolitan theatres, noting their areas, internal forms, acoustic capabilities, etc.  With a cost of £23,000, the new Theatre Royal opened to an audience of 2,500.  Precautionary measures against fire were taken by placing a tank on the roof capable of holding 20,000 gallons of water, which was connected by pipes to the stage and the green room. Its programme that night included Weber's Oberon overture, Douglas Jerrold's "Time works wonders" and an elaborate ballet spectacle "The Court Ball in 1740". Knowles's schedule of productions was intensive – in one season there were 157 performances at which two and sometimes three plays were performed. The popularity of the theatre grew. Charles Dickens, John Leech and George Cruikshank were amongst notable people who appeared at the theatre. The theatre was dedicated to Shakespeare and Knowles installed a Carrara marble statue of the playwright above the entrance. It was Manchester's finest outdoor statue. In 1875, after years of success, Knowles severed his connections with the theatre, disposing of it to a limited company for £50,000.

Later use
In 1921 the theatre was converted to a cinema due to competition from the Palace Theatre, Manchester and the Manchester Opera House. In 1972 the theatre became a bingo hall, then a nightclub in 1978, at which point various lighting bridges and rigs were added. It was known successively as the "Discotheque Royale", Infinity (from August 2000) then M2 and finally a rename and rebrand to Coliseum due to the trouble caused by the clientele it attracted. The nightclub closed in 2009.

In 2008 a  28-storey office and retail tower was proposed, called "Theatre Royal Tower", that would be connected to the back of the original theatre. It was designed by Stephenson Bell with The Benmore Group as the developer.

It was announced in 2011 by owners Benmore that the Theatre Royal would receive a £2 million refurbishment to convert the building into a live music venue. Plans to convert the building into a hotel and live music venue never came about.

Despite the promise of investment, Benmore sold the building in November 2012. It was purchased by the Edwardian Group, who owned the Radisson Blu Edwardian hotel adjacent to the theatre in the Free Trade Hall. The building could potentially be restored as a theatre or banqueting hall as a complementary extension for the hotel.

 the building remains unused, with the Edwardian Group carrying out feasibility studies for the building. Theatres Trust has placed the building on its "Theatre Buildings At Risk" register.

The 1845 exterior façade is virtually intact, and the building retains the balcony from 1875. Theatres Trust has said that the internal conversions for its past usage in various guises appear to have obscured – rather than destroyed  – the interior. The Trust classify the original interior work as "restorable as a theatre".

See also

Listed buildings in Manchester-M2

References

Notes

Bibliography

Theatres in Manchester
Grade II listed buildings in Manchester
Grade II listed theatres
Neoclassical architecture in England
Theatres completed in 1845